Cheers 2 U is the only studio album by American R&B group Playa, released March 24, 1998, on Def Jam Recordings subsidiary Def Soul.

Background
The album was originally going to be named eponymously, and release was planned for October 1997. Later, Static named the album Cheers 2 U after one of their songs. It was primarily produced by Smokey and Timbaland. All three members share lead vocals on most songs, with Static dueting with Aaliyah on "One Man Woman", Black leading "Everybody Wanna Luv Somebody", and Black and Smokey handling leads on the title track.

Release and reception

The album peaked at number 86 on the US Billboard 200 and reached 19 on the R&B Albums chart.

Leo Stanley of AllMusic called the album "a promising debut" and also referred to it as a work of "enormous potential".

Track listing

Personnel
Information taken from AllMusic.
Arranging, vocals and backing vocals – Playa
Assistant engineering – Wayne Allison, Victor Bruno, James Rosenthal
Assistant mixing – James Rosenthal, Todd Wachsmuth
Engineering – Wayne Allison, Jimmy Douglass, Rob Paustian, Steve Sola, Timbaland
Executive production – Barry Hankerson, Jomo Hankerson
Guitar – Bill Pettaway
Keyboards – Kerie Cooper
Mixing – Conley Abrams, Jimmy Douglass, Timbaland
Performer(s) – Aaliyah, Magoo, Missy Elliott, Foxy Brown
Photography – Jonathan Mannion
Production – James Earl Jones III, Derick "D Man" McElveen, Smokey, Timbaland
Programming – Derick "D Man" McElveen
Vocal arrangement – James Earl Jones III, Playa, Static

Charts

Album

Singles

References

External links
 Cheers 2 U at Discogs

1998 debut albums
Albums produced by Dr. Dre
Albums produced by Timbaland
Def Jam Recordings albums
Playa (band) albums